The Trojan Women is a 1971 American-British-Greek drama film directed by Michael Cacoyannis and starring Katharine Hepburn, Vanessa Redgrave, Geneviève Bujold and Irene Papas. The film was made with the minimum of changes to Edith Hamilton's translation of Euripides' original play, save for the omission of deities, as Cacoyannis said they were "hard to film and make realistic".

Plot
The Trojan Women was one of a trilogy of plays dealing with the suffering created by the Trojan Wars. Hecuba (Katharine Hepburn), Queen of the Trojans and mother of Hector, one of Troy's most fearsome warriors, looks upon the remains of her kingdom; Andromache (Vanessa Redgrave), widow of the slain Hector and mother of his son Astyanax, believes that she must raise her son in the war's aftermath; however, Talthybius (Brian Blessed), the messenger of the Greeks, comes to the ruined city, and tells them that King Agamemnon and his brother Menelaus have decreed that Hector's son Astyanax must die — the last of the male royalty of Troy must be executed to ensure the extinction of the line. Cassandra (Geneviève Bujold), Hecuba's daughter who has been driven insane by the ravages of war, waits to see if King Agamemnon will send her into concubinage, while Helen of Troy (Irene Papas), waits to see if she will live.

Cast
Katharine Hepburn as Hecuba, Queen of the Trojans
Vanessa Redgrave as Andromache, widow of Hector
Geneviève Bujold as Cassandra, Hecuba's daughter
Irene Papas as Helen of Troy
Brian Blessed as Talthybius
Patrick Magee as Menelaus, King of Sparta

Production
When filming began in the Spanish village of Atienza, 80 miles northeast of Madrid, sections of the press were speculating that there might be fireworks between the lead actresses. Hepburn had recently gone on record deploring the moral squalor and carelessness of the modern generation, and the impulsive and radical Redgrave was thought by some of the press to be a symbol of that "sloppy" generation. In fact, the actresses got on well, talking about painting, politics, and acting —Hepburn expressed enthusiasm for Redgrave's 1966 Rosalind in As You Like It— and both actresses began to learn Spanish.

Cacoyannis first staged The Trojan Women in Italy in 1963, with Rod Steiger, Claire Bloom, and Mildred Dunnock in the leading roles. Later in the same year, he took the production to New York, and in 1965, to Paris. "For me", he said in a 1971 magazine interview, "the play is particularly pertinent and real. What the play is saying is as important today as it was when it was written. I feel very strongly about war, militarism, killing people ... and I haven't found a better writer who makes that point more clearly than Euripides. The play is about the folly of war, the folly of people killing others and forgetting that they are going to die themselves."

Katharine Hepburn's costume was designed by Nicholas Georgiadis of Covent Garden. Cacoyannis hand-picked Italy's Franco Freda and Adalgisa Favella as make-up artist and hair stylist, respectively, for the film. Both were veterans of the films of Federico Fellini, Michelangelo Antonioni, and Luchino Visconti.

Hepburn said of her acting for this part: "My acting has always been a little flamboyant and rococo. But for this part, I've had to pare right down to the bare essentials." Her acting voice dropped, after special training, by an octave, and was almost accentless; the familiar twanging  pitch and  East Coast rhythms almost vanished.

Awards
Kansas City Film Critics Circle
Kansas City Film Critics Circle Award for Best Actress - Katharine Hepburn (won)

National Board of Review of Motion Pictures
NBR Award for Best Actress - Irene Papas (won)

See also
 List of American films of 1971
 List of historical drama films
 Greek mythology in popular culture

References

External links

American war drama films
British war drama films
Greek war drama films
English-language Greek films
Films directed by Michael Cacoyannis
Films based on ancient Greek plays
1971 films
1971 drama films
Films shot in Spain
Films set in ancient Greece
Films based on works by Euripides
Trojan War films
Siege films
Films scored by Mikis Theodorakis
Cultural depictions of Helen of Troy
Cinerama Releasing Corporation films
Films shot in the province of Guadalajara
1970s English-language films
1970s American films
1970s British films
1970s war drama films